The 1984–85 FC Bayern Munich season was the 85th season in the club's history.  Bayern Munich won its seventh Bundesliga title, reached the semi-final of UEFA Cup Winners' Cup, and finished as runner-up of DFB-Pokal.  This season was the second season of Udo Lattek's second stint as manager of the club.  The Bundesliga campaign started 25 August 1984 with a 3-1 victory over Arminia Bielefeld.  Bayern Munich, 1. FC Köln, and Borussia Mönchengladbach were tied for first place after Round 1.  From Round 2 through Round 34 of the season, Bayern Munich were the lone team in first place.  Qualification for the 1984–85 European Cup Winners' Cup was a result of winning the 1983–84 DFB-Pokal.

Players

Squad, appearances and goals

|}

Goals

Bookings

Transfers

In
First Team

Total spending:  €1.275m

Out
First Team

Total income:  €5.5m

Notes
 Note 1: Manfred Müller retired at the end of the 1983–84 season before making a return for one game in November 1986 for 1. FC Nürnberg.

Totals

Results

Pre-season
19th Joan Gamper Trophy

Bundesliga

Results by round

DFB Pokal

European Cup Winners' Cup

1st round

2nd round

Quarter-finals

Semi-finals

References

FC Bayern Munich seasons
Bayern Munich
German football championship-winning seasons